65 athletes (56 men and 9 women) from South Korea competed at the 1996 Summer Paralympics in Atlanta, United States.

Medallists

See also
South Korea at the Paralympics
South Korea at the 1996 Summer Olympics

References 

Nations at the 1996 Summer Paralympics
1996
Summer Paralympics